Teremets is a rural locality (a village) in Novoalexandrovskoye Rural Settlement, Suzdalsky District, Vladimir Oblast, Russia. The population was 3 as of 2010.

Geography 
Teremets is located 31 km southwest of Suzdal (the district's administrative centre) by road. Kutukovo is the nearest rural locality.

References 

Rural localities in Suzdalsky District